Tapinoma williamsi is a species of ant in the genus Tapinoma. Described by William Morton Wheeler in 1935, the species is endemic to Malaysia and the Philippines.

References

Tapinoma
Hymenoptera of Asia
Insects described in 1935